Michael Levitt is a former Canadian politician who represented the riding of York Centre in the House of Commons of Canada from 2015 to 2020 as a member of the Liberal Party.

Background

Born and raised in Scotland, Levitt came with his family to Canada when he was 14. Levitt is Jewish.

Levitt served as Chair of the House of Commons Foreign Affairs Committee and Chair of the Canada-Israel Interparliamentary Group.

Before running for office, Levitt was a founding member of the Canadian Jewish Political Affairs Committee, co-chaired Liberal Friends of Israel, and served as a Partner and Vice-President of Business Development for the Benjamin Group in Toronto, a company providing lifecycle services to Toronto's Jewish community. He has also served on the boards of Mount Sinai Hospital and the Koffler Centre of the Arts, both located in Toronto.

Political career

Levitt was first elected to Parliament in the 2015 federal election, defeating the Conservative incumbent, Mark Adler. He was re-elected in the 2019 federal election.

On August 4, 2020, Levitt announced he would resign as an MP, effective September 1, 2020, to become the President and CEO of the Canadian regional office of the Friends of Simon Wiesenthal Center for Holocaust Studies.

Electoral record

References

External links
 Official Website

1974 births
Living people
Jewish Canadian politicians
Jewish Canadian activists
Canadian Zionists
Liberal Party of Canada MPs
Members of the House of Commons of Canada from Ontario
Politicians from Edinburgh
Politicians from Toronto
Scottish emigrants to Canada
21st-century Canadian politicians